This is a round-up of the 1984 Sligo Senior Football Championship. In Centenary Year, it was St. Mary's who retained the title, defeating Tubbercurry in a disappointing final. The champions had been brought to a replay by Curry in the semi-final, however St. Mary's won that replay with ease.

Quarter finals

Semi-finals

Sligo Senior Football Championship Final

References

 Sligo Champion (July–August 1984)

Sligo Senior Football Championship
Sligo Senior Football Championship